Platycerus piceus is a species of stag beetle, from the Lucinidae family and Lucaninae subfamily. It was discovered by William Kirby in 1837.

Geographical distribution 
It can be found in North America.

References 

Lucanidae
Beetles of North America
Beetles described in 1837
Taxa named by William Kirby (entomologist)